The French cruiser Sully was one of five armored cruisers of the  that were built for the French Navy in the early 1900s. Completed in 1904, Sully joined her sister ships in the Northern Squadron, although she was transferred to the Far East shortly afterwards. The ship struck a rock in Hạ Long Bay, French Indochina in 1905, only eight months after she was completed, and was a total loss.

Design and description

The Gloire-class ships were designed as enlarged and improved versions of the preceding  by Emile Bertin. They displaced . Their crew numbered 25 officers and 590 enlisted men.

The sisters' propulsion machinery consisted of three vertical triple-expansion steam engines, each driving a single propeller shaft, using steam provided by water-tube boilers, but the types of machinery differed between them.

Armament and armor
The main battery of the Gloire class consisted of two quick-firing (QF) 194 mm Modèle 1893–1896 guns mounted in single-gun turrets fore and aft of the superstructure. Their secondary armament comprised eight QF 164.7 mm Modèle 1893–1896 guns and six QF Canon de  Modèle de 1893 guns. Half of the 164.7 mm guns were in two singe-gun wing turrets on each broadside and all of the remaining guns were on single mounts in casemates in the hull. For defense against torpedo boats, they carried eighteen  and four  Hotchkiss guns, all of which were in single mounts. The sisters were also armed with five  torpedo tubes, of which two were submerged and three above water. Two of these were on each broadside and the fifth tube was in the stern. All of the above-water tubes were on pivot mounts. The ships varied in the number of naval mines that they could carry and Sully was fitted with storage for 10.

The Gloire class were the first French armored cruisers to have their waterline armored belt made from Harvey face-hardened armor plates. Because of manufacturing limitations, the thinner end plates were nickel steel. Behind the belt was a cofferdam, backed by a longitudinal watertight bulkhead.

The casemates protecting the 100-millimeter guns also had a thickness of 102 millimeters. The face and sides of the conning tower were 174 millimeters thick.

Construction and career
Sully, named after the statesman Maximilien de Béthune, Duke of Sully, was authorized in the 1898 Naval Program and was ordered from Forges et Chantiers de la Méditerranée on 24 May 1899. The ship was laid down on that same day at their shipyard in La Seyne-sur-Mer, launched on 4 June 1901, and completed in June 1904.

The ship was sent to French Indochina for her first commission. On 7 February 1905 Sully struck a rock in Hạ Long Bay; her crew was not injured. Her guns and equipment were salvaged, but the ship broke in two and was abandoned as a total loss.

Notes

References

External links
 Later French Armored Cruisers, 1902-1911

1901 ships
Ships built in France
Gloire-class cruisers
Maritime incidents in 1905
Ships sunk with no fatalities
Shipwrecks in the South China Sea